Nyarna Lwin (born 2 July 1990) is a footballer from Myanmar. He made his first appearance for the Myanmar national football team in 2010.

References 

1990 births
Living people
Burmese footballers
Myanmar international footballers
Association football defenders
Southeast Asian Games bronze medalists for Myanmar
Southeast Asian Games medalists in football
Competitors at the 2011 Southeast Asian Games